Quảng Phương  is a commune (xã) and village in Quảng Trạch District, Quảng Bình Province, in Vietnam.

Populated places in Quảng Bình province
Communes of Quảng Bình province
District capitals in Vietnam